York River State Park is located near the unincorporated town of Croaker in James City County, Virginia on the south bank of the York River about 10 miles downstream from West Point.

The York River is formed from the confluence of the Mattaponi River and the Pamunkey River at West Point. The York River empties into the Chesapeake Bay about 30 miles downstream from Croaker Landing.

In the state park, the historical Croaker Landing is an archaeological site listed in the National Register of Historic Places since 1987. The name "Croaker" is believed to have derived from the abundant quantity of Atlantic croaker (Micropogonias undulatus), an inshore, bottom-dwelling fish found in the Chesapeake Bay at the mouth of the York River. The site contains evidence of Native American habitation throughout the Woodland period (c. 1000 B.C. - A.D. 1600).  It was listed on the National Register of Historic Places in 1987.

The town of Croaker was known in its early history as Taskinas Plantation. It was the site of a 17th and 18th century public tobacco warehouse where local planters stored their crops to be shipped to England.

York River State Park opened in 1980. It is accessed via Exit 231-B of Interstate 64, which is signed "Croaker-Norge." The old Richmond-Williamsburg Stage Road, now U.S. Route 60, also is nearby.

See also
 List of Virginia state parks
 List of Virginia state forests

References

External links

York River State Park
Friends of York River State Park
Virtual Tours of York River State Park
Taskinas Plantation

Archaeological sites on the National Register of Historic Places in Virginia
York River State Park
York River
National Register of Historic Places in James City County, Virginia
IUCN Category V
Protected areas established in 1980
1980 establishments in Virginia